Shama Khalid was a Pakistani politician from Gilgit-Baltistan who served as the 2nd Governor of the Gilgit Baltistan.

Career
Dr Shama belonged to Astore Valley and her father Wazir Ashraf Khan was a law graduate from the famous Aligarh University. She excelled in education and completed her MBBS from Peshawar in 1968. It is said that she was the first woman from Gilgit-Baltistan region to become a doctor.

After her marriage, Dr Shama settled in Abbottabad where she started her practice. She worked in the population ministry for 20 years. During that period she carried out social work in her area and regularly visited Gilgit-Baltistan to organise medical camps there. She also worked for social organisations, including "Save the Children".

Death
On 16 September 2010 she died of cancer.

References

2010 deaths
21st-century Pakistani women politicians
Governors of Gilgit-Baltistan